The Suzuki Let's is a scooter manufactured by Suzuki motorcycle india limited, a subsidiary of Japanese motorcycle company Suzuki.
The scooter was showcased by the company at the 2014 Auto Expo.

Technology

SEP
The Suzuki Let's is powered by a brand new engine made by Suzuki which uses SEP (Suzuki Eco Performance). The technology involves use of lighter rocker arms and alterations to the valve angle, in an effort to increase the combustion efficiency of the engine.

References

Indian motor scooters
Motor scooters
Let's
Motorcycles introduced in 2014